Aingiri is a village in Chandpur District in the Chittagong Division of Eastern Bangladesh.

Description 
Aingiri is located in the district of Kachua Upazila.

Population 
Aingiri has different educational institutions, including;
 Aingiri Government Primary School
 Aingiri High School
 Aingiri Golzarshah Islamia Alim Madrasha

Amenities 
Aingiri has a government hospital. The village has 6 mosques.

There is a Hindu temple in Karmokar Bari.

References

Villages in Chandpur District
Villages in Chittagong Division